Irja Ester Helena "Leena" Pietilä, married surname: Vainio (born 29 March 1925 – 20 May 2014) was a Finnish figure skater. She was a two-time Nordic champion and a seven-time Finnish national champion.

Early life 
On 29 March 1925, Pietilä was born in Rauma, Finland.

Career 
Pietilä was a figure skater for Helsingfors Skridskoklubb in Helsinki. Pietilä placed 16th at the 1947 World Championships in Stockholm, Sweden; 13th at the 1950 European Championships in Oslo, Norway; and 13th at the 1951 European Championships in Zürich, Switzerland.

In February 1952, Pietilä represented Finland at the 1952 Winter Olympics in Oslo, Norway, and finished 20th.

After retiring from competition, Pietilä became an international figure skating judge and coach.

Competitive highlights

Personal life 
On May 20, 2014, Pietilä died in Mikkeli, Finland. Pietilä was 89.

See also 
 Finnish Figure Skating Championships

References

External links 
 Finnish Figure Skating Association at stll.fi (in Finnish)

1925 births
2014 deaths
Figure skaters at the 1952 Winter Olympics
Finnish female single skaters
Olympic figure skaters of Finland
People from Rauma, Finland
Sportspeople from Satakunta
20th-century Finnish women